The 1905 Oklahoma A&M Aggies football team represented Oklahoma A&M College in the 1905 college football season. This was the fifth year of football at A&M and the team's head coach was F. A. McCoy. The Aggies played their home games in Stillwater, Oklahoma Territory. They finished the season 1–4–2.

Schedule

References

Oklahoma AandM
Oklahoma State Cowboys football seasons
Oklahoma AandM Aggies football